Jæger Dokk (12 December 1921 – 17 June 2000) was a Norwegian insurance leader. He was born in Aker. He was CEO of the insurance company Samtrygd/Gjensidige from 1958 to 1984. He was decorated Knight, First Class of the Order of St. Olav in 1985.

References

1921 births
2000 deaths
20th-century Norwegian businesspeople
Businesspeople from Oslo